Striplin is a surname. Notable people with the surname include: 

Larry Striplin (1929–2012), American college basketball and baseball coach
Sylvia Striplin (born 1954), American singer